The Girl on the Bridge is a 1999 French drama film shot in black and white and directed by Patrice Leconte, starring Daniel Auteuil and Vanessa Paradis.

Plot 

After an interview sequence with a girl, the plot centres around knifethrower Gabor (Auteuil) and the girl, called Adèle (Paradis), whom he meets as she prepares to kill herself by jumping from a bridge. Gabor intervenes to prevent the suicide and persuades Adèle to become the target girl in his knifethrowing act. The film then follows their relationship as they travel to Monaco then into Italy and onto a cruise ship with their act. Their companionship and teamwork mean great luck for both of them. Then they get separated, she to Greece and he to Turkey, and their lives once again become luckless. The film ends on a bridge in Istanbul, this time with her saving him from suicide.

Cast
 Vanessa Paradis as Adèle
 Daniel Auteuil as Gabor
 Frédéric Pfluger as Contortionist
 Demetre Georgalas as Takis
 Catherine Lascault as Irène
 Isabelle Petit-Jacques as Bride
 Mireille Mossé as Miss Memory
 Didier Lemoine as TGV ticket conductor
 Mylène Farmer (uncredited guest appearance in a hallway and beside the stage)
 Bertie Cortez as Kusak
 Stéphane Metzger as Italian waiter
 Claude Aufaure as Suicide victim
 Farouk Bermouga as TGV waiter
 Nicolas Donato as Mr. Loyal
 Enzo Etokyo as Italian megaphone
 Giorgios Gatzios as Barker

Music 
The soundtrack consists entirely of existing music, with Who Will Take My Dreams Away by Marianne Faithfull, I'm sorry by Brenda Lee and Goodbye in a version of Benny Goodman recurring during the film. Other music includes other numbers by Benny Goodman and Noro Morales, Festival in Valencia by Charles Smitton, Italian music by the Orchestra Secondo Casadei, Turkish music from the Istanbul Oriental Ensemble, and the Austrian National Anthem.

Release
The film grossed 22.6 million Franc ($3.4 million) in France. Paramount Classics acquired the United States distribution rights to this film and gave it a limited U.S. theatrical release on July 28, 2000; the film went on to gross $1,708,839 in U.S. theaters, which was a good result for a non-English film.  Ruth Vitale (president of Paramount Classics at that time) declared herself pleased with the film's performance in the U.S. market. However, Paramount did not release the film on DVD until July 2008.

Daniel Auteuil won a César as best actor for his role in 2000, and a similar prize at the Festival de Sant Jordi in 2001. The film won the Prix du public at the Cinemania festival in Montréal in 1999 and the best foreign film at the Las Vegas Film Critics Society Awards in 2000.

The action of the film proper begins on the passerelle Debilly in Paris, and ends on the Galata bridge in Istanbul.

See also
 Impalement arts

References

External links
 Official Site (US)
 
 Girl on the Bridge at Rotten Tomatoes

1999 films
1999 romantic drama films
French romantic drama films
1990s French-language films
Films directed by Patrice Leconte
Films featuring a Best Actor César Award-winning performance
Paramount Vantage films
Films set in France
Films set in Monaco
Films set in Paris
Films set in Italy
Films set in Istanbul
Films set in Greece
Films shot in Istanbul
1990s French films